Pablo César Solari (born 22 March 2001) is an Argentine professional footballer who plays as a forward for River Plate.

Club career
Solari joined Talleres from Club Rumbo a Vélez at the age of thirteen. He signed his first professional contract in February 2020, having trained with Talleres' first-team in the preceding month; notably appearing in a Torneos de Verano friendly with San Lorenzo on 11 January. Towards the end of 2020, Solari was an unused substitute for Copa de la Liga Profesional matches with Newell's Old Boys, on 30 October, and Lanús, on 9 November. On 20 November, Solari headed to Chilean Primera División side Colo-Colo on loan until 31 January 2021. He made his debut on 5 December off the bench in a draw away to Huachipato.

On 2 February 2021, after five appearances, Solari's loan with Colo-Colo was extended until 31 December. On 17 February, Solari scored the only goal of the game as Colo-Colo defeated Universidad de Concepción in a play-off to avoid relegation.

International career
Solari represented Argentina at U16 and U18 level. He was a part of the U16 side that won the 2019 Montaigu Tournament. Later that year, for the U18s, Solari made four appearances and scored one goal (versus Mauritania) at the 2019 COTIF Tournament in Spain; under manager Esteban Solari (no relation).

Style of play
Solari is primarily a winger, though he holds experience as a centre-back, an attacking midfielder and as a centre-forward from his youth career.

Personal life
Solari is the son of former footballer Victor Solari, who played in the local Liga Roca with Sportivo Realicó in the 1990s. He also has three footballing brothers: Santiago, Mateo and Juan.

Career statistics
.

Honours

Youth team
Argentina U16
Montaigu Tournament: 2019

Club
Colo-Colo
 Copa Chile (1): 2021

Notes

References

External links

2001 births
Living people
People from San Luis Province
Argentine footballers
Argentina youth international footballers
Association football forwards
Argentine expatriate footballers
Expatriate footballers in Chile
Argentine expatriate sportspeople in Chile
Chilean Primera División players
Argentine Primera División players
Talleres de Córdoba footballers
Colo-Colo footballers
Club Atlético River Plate footballers